Asteria may refer to:

Asteria (mythology), any one of various female figures in Greek mythology
Asteria (band), an American band
ASTERIA (spacecraft), a miniaturized space telescope
Asteria Regio, a region on the planet Venus
Asteria Medievale, a medieval music ensemble

See also 
Asterias, a genus of sea star
Asterism (gemology)